Palo Verde or palo verde may refer to:

Arts, entertainment, and media
 "Palo Verde", a song by The Fireman from the album Rushes (1998)

Biology
 Palo verde beetle, a species of longhorn beetle
 Parkinsonia, a genus of perennial flowering plants, commonly known as palo verde

Buildings

Schools
 Palo Verde College in Blythe, California, United States
 Palo Verde High School in Las Vegas, Nevada, United States
 Palo Verde High School (Arizona) in Tucson, Arizona, United States
 Palo Verde Christian High School in Tucson, Arizona, United States

Other buildings
 Palo Verde Hospital in Blythe, California, United States
 Palo Verde Nuclear Generating Station in Wintersburg, Arizona, United States
 Palo Verde Biological Station in Palo Verde National Park, Costa Rica
 Palo Verde station, a rapid transit station in Caracas, Venezuela

Cities and towns
 Palo Verde, Arizona, United States
 Palo Verde, California, United States
 Palo Verde, Monte Cristi Province, Dominican Republic
 Palo Verde, Jalapa, Guatemala
 Palo Verde, Caracas, Venezuela
 Canton Palo Verde, Sonsonate, El Salvador

Natural features
 Palo Verde Mountains, California, United States
 Palo Verde National Park, Costa Rica
 Palo Verde Valley, United States

See also

 Paloverde (disambiguation)